Graham Greene (1904–1991) was an English novelist regarded by many as one of the greatest writers of the 20th century.  Combining literary acclaim with widespread popularity, Greene acquired a reputation early in his lifetime as a major writer, both of serious Catholic novels, and of thrillers (or "entertainments" as he termed them). He was shortlisted, in 1966 and 1967, for the Nobel Prize for Literature. He produced over 25 novels, as well as several plays, autobiographies, and short stories.

Verse
Babbling April (1925)
 A Quick Look Behind: Footnotes to an Autobiography (1983)

Novels
The Man Within (1929)
The Name of Action (1930) (repudiated by author, never re-published)
Rumour at Nightfall (1931) (repudiated by author, never re-published)
Stamboul Train (1932) (also published as Orient Express)
It's a Battlefield (1934)
England Made Me (1935) (also published as The Shipwrecked)
A Gun for Sale (1936) (also published as This Gun for Hire)
Brighton Rock (1938)
The Confidential Agent (1939)
The Power and the Glory (1940) (also published as The Labyrinthine Ways)
The Ministry of Fear (1943)
The Heart of the Matter (1948)
The Third Man (1949) (novella, as a basis for the screenplay)
The End of the Affair (1951)
The Quiet American (1955)
Loser Takes All (1955)
Our Man in Havana (1958)
A Burnt-Out Case (1960)
The Comedians (1966)
Travels with My Aunt (1969)
The Honorary Consul (1973)
The Human Factor (1978)
Doctor Fischer of Geneva or The Bomb Party (1980)
Monsignor Quixote (1982)
The Tenth Man (1985)
The Captain and the Enemy (1988)

Autobiography
A Sort of Life (1971)
Ways of Escape (1980)
Getting To Know The General: The Story of an Involvement (1984)
A World of My Own: A Dream Diary (1992)

Travel books
Journey Without Maps (1936)
The Lawless Roads (1939) (also published as Another Mexico)
In Search of a Character: Two African Journals (1961)
A Weed Among the Flowers (1990)

Plays
The Great Jowett (1939) [radio play]
The Living Room (1953)
The Potting Shed (1957)
The Complaisant Lover (1959)
Carving a Statue (1964)
The Return of A.J. Raffles (1975)
Yes and No (1980)
For Whom the Bell Chimes (1980)

Screenplays
The Future's in the Air (1937)
The Green Cockatoo (1937)
The New Britain (1940)
21 Days (1940) (based on the novel The First and The Last by John Galsworthy)
Brighton Rock (1947)
The Fallen Idol (1948)
The Third Man (1949)
Loser Takes All (1956)
Saint Joan (1957) (based on the play by George Bernard Shaw)
Our Man in Havana (1959)
The Comedians (1967)

Short stories
"The Bear Fell Free" (1935)
Twenty-One Stories (1954) (originally The Basement Room [1935] with 8 stories; then Nineteen Stories [1947] adding 11 new stories; then Twenty-One Stories [1954] adding 4 new stories and removing 2 previous)
"The End of the Party" (1929)
"The Second Death" (1929)
"Proof Positive" (1930)
"I Spy" (1930)
"A Day Saved" (1934)
"Jubilee" (1936)
"Brother" (1936)
"A Chance For Mr Lever" (1936)
"The Basement Room" (1936) (adapted by the author as The Fallen Idol, a film directed by Carol Reed)
"The Innocent" (1937)
"A Drive in the Country" (1937)
"Across the Bridge" (1938)
"A Little Place Off the Edgware Road" (1939)
"The Case for the Defence" (1939)
"Alas, Poor Maling" (1940)
"Men at Work" (1940)
"When Greek Meets Greek" (1941) (elsewhere retitled "Her Uncle Versus His Father")
"The Hint of an Explanation" (1948)
"The Blue Film" (1954)
"Special Duties" (1954) (elsewhere retitled "A Peculiar Affair of Westbourne Grove")
"The Destructors" (1954)
 A Visit to Morin (1960)
 A Sense of Reality (1963)
"Under the Garden"
"A Visit to Morin" (previously published in a limited edition)
"Dream of a Strange Land"
"A Discovery in the Woods"
 May We Borrow Your Husband? (1967)
"May We Borrow Your Husband?"
"Beauty"
"Chagrin in Three Parts"
"The Over-night Bag"
"Mortmain"
"Cheap in August"
"A Shocking Accident"
"The Invisible Japanese Gentlemen"
"Awful When You Think of It"
"Doctor Crombie"
"The Root of All Evil"
"Two Gentle People"
 Collected Stories (1973) (including May We Borrow Your Husband?, A Sense of Reality, and Twenty-One Stories)
 How Father Quixote Became a Monsignor (1980) (later becoming the first chapter of the novel Monsignor Quixote [1982])
 "The New House" (1988)
 The Last Word and Other Stories (1990)
"The Last Word"
"The News in English"
"The Moment of Truth"
"The Man Who Stole the Eiffel Tower"
"The Lieutenant Died Last"
"A Branch of the Service"
"An Old Man's Memory"
"The Lottery Ticket"
"The New House" (previously published in a limited edition)
"Work Not in Progress"
"Murder for the Wrong Reason"
"An Appointment With the General"
 The Complete Short Stories (2005) (adding The Last Word, and adding or reinstating 4 stories, to Collected Stories)
"The Blessing" (1966)
"Church Militant" (1956)
"Dear Dr Falkenheim" (1963)
"The Other Side of the Border" (1936 unfinished novel originally published in Nineteen Stories [1947])
No Man's Land (2005) (a film story, posthumously published with an incomplete film story, The Stranger's Hand)

Children's books
The Little Train (1946, illus. Dorothy Craigie; 1973, illus. Edward Ardizzone)
The Little Fire Engine (1950, illus. Dorothy Craigie; 1973, illus. Edward Ardizzone)
The Little Horse Bus (1952, illus. Dorothy Craigie; 1974, illus. Edward Ardizzone)
The Little Steamroller (1953, illus. Dorothy Craigie; 1974, illus. Edward Ardizzone)

Other non-fiction
The Old School: Essays by Divers Hands (ed. Greene, 1934)
British Dramatists (1942)
Why Do I Write? An Exchange of Views between Elizabeth Bowen, Graham Greene and V.S. Pritchett (1948)
The Lost Childhood and Other Essays (1951)
The Spy's Bedside Book (ed. with Hugh Greene, 1957)
Collected Essays (1969)
Lord Rochester's Monkey: Being the Life of John Wilmot, Second Earl of Rochester (1974)
An Impossible Woman: The Memories of Dottoressa Moor of Capri (ed. Greene, 1975)
The Pleasure-Dome: The Collected Film Criticism, 1935–40 (ed. John Russell Taylor, 1980)
J'Accuse: The Dark Side of Nice (1982)
Reflections on Travels With My Aunt (1989)
Yours, etc.: Letters to the Press (1989)
Why the Epigraph? (1989)
Reflections (1991)
The Graham Greene Film Reader: Reviews, Essays, Interviews and Film Stories (ed. David Parkinson, 1993) (also published as Mornings in the Dark: The Graham Greene Film Reader)
Articles of Faith: The Collected Tablet Journalism of Graham Greene (ed. Ian Thomson, 2006)
Graham Greene: A Life in Letters (ed. Richard Greene, 2007)

References

Bibliography
Bibliographies of British writers